Teófila Márquiz (born 5 March 1932) is a Venezuelan fencer. She competed in the women's team foil event at the 1960 Summer Olympics.

References

External links
 

1932 births
Living people
Venezuelan female foil fencers
Olympic fencers of Venezuela
Fencers at the 1960 Summer Olympics
20th-century Venezuelan women